Villa La Tapera is a Chilean hamlet in Coihaique Province, Aisén Region. It is the administrative center of the commune of Lago Verde.

Hamlets in Chile
Populated places in Coyhaique Province